Call Your Friends is the tenth studio album by American punk rock band Zebrahead released in Japan on August 7, 2013 and worldwide on August 13 and 16, 2013 respectively. The album is available in five different covers, each available in a specific region.

Long-time guitarist Greg Bergdorf departed before album's production and at the start of writing the album. He was replaced by Dan Palmer of Death by Stereo.

Track listing

Personnel

Zebrahead
Ali Tabatabaee – rapping
Matty Lewis – lead vocals, rhythm guitar
Dan Palmer – lead guitar
Ben Osmundson – bass guitar
Ed Udhus – drums

Additional artists
Cameron Webb – keyboards
Jason Freese – additional instruments

Production
Cameron Webb – production, mixer, engineer
Brian Gardner – mastering

Artwork
Robby Wallace – artwork and layout
Tom Hoppa – photography
Tawnie Jaclyn – model

Release history

References

2013 albums
Zebrahead albums